Göktaş Dam ) is a hydroelectric plant in Turkey.

It is on Zamantı River, a tributary of Seyhan River.

Two units of the hydroelectric plant was opened to service on 2 October 2015. On 29 December 2016 other units were also put into service. Its nominal output power is 275.6 MWe and the annual energy production is 594 GW-hr. Its operator is Bereket Energy.

References

Dams in Adana Province
Hydroelectric power stations in Turkey
Dams completed in 2015
Dams on the Seyhan River
2015 establishments in Turkey